Punta Artica or Monte Artica is a mountain in the department of Haute-Corse on the island of Corsica, France.
It is in the Monte Rotondo massif.

Location

The peak of Punta Artica is in the commune of Casamaccioli just south of the border with the commune of Albertacce.
It is the highest point on the ridge line that separates the Golo and Tavignano valleys.

Physical

Description
Edward Lear (1812–1888) wrote in 1870,

Gallery

Notes

Sources

Mountains of Haute-Corse